Narket  is a village in Kapurthala district of Punjab State, India. The village is administrated by a Sarpanch, who is an elected representative.

Demography 
According to the report published by Census India in 2011, Narket has 68 houses with the total population of 398 persons of which 205 are male and 193 females. Literacy rate of  Narket is 76.57%, higher than the state average of 75.84%.  The population of children in the age group 0–6 years is 48 which is 12.06% of the total population.  Child sex ratio is approximately 920, higher than the state average of 846.

Population data

Nearby villages  
 Khangah
 Majorwala
 Khukhrain
 Gaunswala
 Rajpur
 Alaudinpur
 Ghug
 Tayabpur
 Chak Gajiwal
 Jahangirpur
 Khiranwali

References

External links
  Villages in Kapurthala
 Kapurthala Villages List

Villages in Kapurthala district